Penzance East is an electoral division of Cornwall in the United Kingdom and returns one member to sit on Cornwall Council. The current Councillor is Tim Dwelly, an Independent and former Portfolio Holder for Culture, Economy and Planning on the council.

Councillors

2009-2021

2021-present

Extent

2009-2021
Under its former boundaries, Penzance East represented the north and east of the town of Penzance, including the area of Treneere. The ward was affected by redistricting at the 2013 election. From 2009 to 2013, the division covered 66.9 hectares in total; from 2013 to 2021 it covered 67.3 hectares.

2021-present
With its current boundaries, the division represents the north and east of the town of Penzance, including the areas of Treneere, Causewayhead and Chyandour.

Election results

2021 election

2017 election

2013 election

2009 election

Notes

References

Penzance
Electoral divisions of Cornwall Council